Taman Kota Station (TKO, formerly Kembangan Station) is a class III railway station located in North Kembangan, Kembangan, West Jakarta. The station, which is located at an altitude of +12 meters, is included in the Jakarta Operational Area I and only serves the KRL Commuterline route.

History
On 16 June 2015, this station was inaugurated together with  Station and  Station, having previously planned to operate on 28 May 2015. However, the residents had opposed the station project due to disruption of access to residents.

This is because the majority of KRL Commuterline passengers are used to using multi-trip cards and electronic money. In this way, long queues to buy KRL tickets can be cut. However, service users can still tap-in/tap-out with THB cards at this station.

Building and layout 
This station has two railway tracks, where both of them are straight tracks.

Services
The following is a list of train services at the Taman Kota Station.

Passenger services 
 KAI Commuter

Intermodal support

Gallery

References

External links

West Jakarta
Railway stations in Jakarta
Railway stations opened in 1899